The 2005 African U-17 Championship qualification was a men's under-17 football competition which decided the participating teams of the 2005 African U-17 Championship.

Qualification

Preliminary round
The first leg matches were played on either the 26th or 27 June 2004. The second leg matches were played on either the 10th or 11 July 2004. The winners advanced to the First Round.

|}

First round
The first leg matches were played on either the 20th or 21 November 2004. The second leg matches were played on either the 4th or 5 November 2004. The winners advanced to the Second Round.
 

|}

Second round
The first leg matches were played on either the 8th or 9 January 2005. The second leg matches were played on either the 22nd or 23 January 2005.  The winners advanced to the Finals.

|}

Qualified teams

 (host nation)

Notes and references

External links
 African U-17 Championship 2005 - rsssf.org

Under-17 Championship Qualification, 2005
2005